Philip Anthony Foster (born April 4, 1958) is an American politician. He served four terms in the Georgia House of Representatives.

Early life and education
Foster was born in Whitfield County, Georgia, in 1958. His father was Ravenel L. Foster, who served in the Georgia House of Representatives between 1973 and 1983.

Political career
In 1982, Foster was elected to the State House at the age of 24, succeeding his father. He served in the chamber as a member of the Democratic Party from 1983 until 1991. As his North Georgia district became increasingly friendly to Republicans down-ballot, Foster faced more difficult reelection campaigns. He was ultimately defeated in 1990 by Republican Harold Mann. The two squared off a second time in 1996, though Mann won decisively and Foster's political career ended.

Personal life
Foster lives in Dalton, Georgia.

References

1958 births
Democratic Party members of the Georgia House of Representatives
20th-century American politicians
Living people
People from Dalton, Georgia